Notodontinae is the nominate subfamily of the moth family Notodontidae. The Ptilodoninae are sometimes merged herein.  The genus list is preliminary, as not all Notodontidae have been assigned to subfamilies yet.

Genera and some species

References

Notodontidae